Kirsch is a German surname. Notable people with the surname include:

 Adam Kirsch (born 1976), an American book critic and writer
 Brandon Kirsch (born 1983), an American football player
 Delbert Kirsch, a Canadian politician
 Don Kirsch (1920–1970), an American college baseball coach
 Ernst Gustav Kirsch (1841–1901), a German engineer
 Helene Kirsch (1906–1999), a German politician
 Irving Kirsch (born 1943), an American professor of psychology
 Johanna Kirsch (1856–1907), a German painter 
 Jonathan Kirsch, an American author, lawyer and columnist
 Olga Kirsch (1924–1997), a South African-Israeli poet
 Philippe Kirsch (born 1947), a Canadian lawyer
 Rainer Kirsch (1934–2015), a German writer and poet
 Randell Kirsch, an American singer and songwriter
 Raymond Kirsch (1942–2013), a Luxembourgian businessman
 Robert Kirsch (1922–1980), American literary critic and author
 Roman Kirsch (born 1988), a German entrepreneur
 Russell Kirsch (1929–2020), created America’s first internally programmable computer and first digital image
 Sarah Kirsch (1935–2013), a German poet
 Stan Kirsch (1968–2020), an American actor
 Steve Kirsch (born 1956), an American inventor
 Theodor Franz Wilhelm Kirsch (1818–1889), a German entomologist who specialised in Coleoptera

See also 
 Kirch (disambiguation)

German-language surnames
Jewish surnames
Surnames from ornamental names